Go Yo-han (born 10 March 1988) is a South Korean football right-back who plays for FC Seoul.

Club career
In 2004, he dropped out of middle school after failing math class and joined FC Seoul.
In 2006, he made his professional league debut in League Cup, after he made 3 appearances and 2 appearances respectively in K-League 2007 and K-League 2008.
In 2009, he gained the opportunity to become a starting player after Lee Chung-Yong moved to Bolton Wanderers.

International career
On 5 October 2009, he was called up first South Korea national team for friendly match against Senegal of 14 October.

In May 2018 he was named in South Korea's preliminary 28 man squad for the 2018 FIFA World Cup in Russia.

Career statistics

Club

Honours

Club
FC Seoul
K League 1: 2010, 2012, 2016
FA Cup: 2015
League Cup: 2006, 2010

International
South Korea
EAFF East Asian Cup
Winners: 2017

Personal life
Unlike most Korean people, Go does not have a Hanja name. His given name, Yo-han, comes from the Korean translation of John (Korean: 요한), apostle of Jesus.

References

External links
 

Go Yo-han – National Team stats at KFA 

1988 births
Living people
South Korean footballers
South Korea under-17 international footballers
South Korea international footballers
FC Seoul players
K League 1 players
Association football central defenders
2018 FIFA World Cup players